Thailand participated in the 1958 Asian Games in Tokyo on 24 May to 1 June 1958. Thailand ended the games at 4 overall medals with no gold medal.

Nations at the 1958 Asian Games
1958
Asian Games